Rice is an unincorporated community in Cloud County, Kansas, United States.

History
In the 19th century, Rice was a station on the Central Branch Union Pacific Railroad, and the town's proximity to the larger trading center of Concordia inhibited its growth.

A post office was opened in Rice in 1878, and remained in operation until it was discontinued in 1980.

Education
The community is served by Concordia USD 333 public school district.

Notable people
 Ross Doyen, farmer, rancher, and Kansas state legislator, was born near Rice.

References

Further reading

External links
 Cloud County maps: Current, Historic, KDOT

Unincorporated communities in Cloud County, Kansas
Unincorporated communities in Kansas